Petter Mathias Olsen (born 13 January 1998) is a Norwegian football midfielder who currently plays for Grorud on loan from Lillestrøm.

References

1998 births
Living people
People from Lørenskog
Norwegian footballers
Lillestrøm SK players
Strømmen IF players
Hamarkameratene players
Grorud IL players
Eliteserien players
Norwegian First Division players
Association football midfielders
Norway youth international footballers
Sportspeople from Viken (county)